Old Dry Road, also known as The Staudt Farm, is a historic home and farm complex located in Lower Heidelberg Township, Berks County, Pennsylvania. The farm is located on a branch of Tulpehocken Creek in the Blue Marsh Lake Recreation Area.

The property was first settled in 1744, and has a late 18th-century "Speicher."  It is a three-story, banked log building used for storage and preserving. Also on the property is a Georgian influenced log dwelling dated to 1770–1805.

The farm was listed on the National Register of Historic Places in 1978.

Old Dry Road Farm is now operated as a living history farm museum.  Programs are offered for school groups, and the farm complex is open to the public for special events.

References

External links
 Old Dry Road Farm - official site

Farms on the National Register of Historic Places in Pennsylvania
Houses in Berks County, Pennsylvania
Museums in Berks County, Pennsylvania
Farm museums in Pennsylvania
National Register of Historic Places in Berks County, Pennsylvania